Urera is a genus of flowering plants in the nettle family, Urticaceae. It has a pantropical distribution.

Description
Urera are lianas, shrubs, and small trees. Climbing species root along the stems and can reach the crowns of the trees they use for support. Some are spiny. They almost always have urticating hairs, often on bumps in the epidermis. These are stiff, stinging trichomes with swollen bases. The leaves are variable in shape and venation, and help in the identification of species. Also useful is the varying appearance and arrangement of cystoliths on the leaf surface. The inflorescence is a divided, branching panicle of flowers. Most species are dioecious, but a few are monoecious. Most species have male flowers with either four or five stamens and tepals. Female flowers generally have four uneven, free to mostly fused tepals. The fruit is an achene covered in orange or red flesh.

Systematics and taxonomy
About 113 species epithets have been published for the genus. Many species have been transferred to other genera, including Boehmeria, Dendrocnide, Girardinia, Gyrotaenia, Laportea, and Obetia. It is not clear how many valid species currently belong in Urera, with estimates ranging from 17 to 75. The genus is not well known, with current knowledge dependent mainly on outdated studies, and there is little agreement regarding its taxonomy.

The genus Urera was first described by Charles Gaudichaud-Beaupré in 1826 in his review of the studies done on Louis de Freycinet's voyage of the Uranie. He noted its distinctness, proposing the subtribe Urereae. This was later raised to the rank of tribe, and subsequently merged into Urticeae.

Urera was expanded to include the monospecific genus Scepocarpus. Analysis of trnL-F chloroplast DNA sequence data suggests that Urera could be sister to Poikilospermum within the Urticaceae.

No botanical monographs have been devoted to Urera since 1869. Knowledge of the systematics of the genus has accumulated mainly from new descriptions of species and floristic accounts.

Selected species

Species include:

Urera acuminata 
Urera aurantiaca  
Urera baccifera (L.) Gaudich. ex Wedd., 1852 – guaritoto, scratchbush
Urera cameroonensis
Urera capitata
Urera caracasana (Jacq.) Gaudich. ex Griseb., 1859 – flameberry
Urera elata
Urera expansa (Sw.) Griseb.
Urera glabra (Hook. & Arn.) Wedd. – hopue, Ōpuhe (Hawaii)
Urera henriquesii
Urera kaalae Wawra – Ōpuhe (Oahu in Hawaii)
Urera laciniata
Urera mannii 
Urera nitida  
Urera repens  
Urera simplex
Urera sinuata  
Urera thonneri
Urera trinervis (Hochst.) Friis & Immelman, 1987 
Urera verrucosa – chichicastle, mala mujer

References

Further reading
 Burger, W. (1977). Urera. Fieldiana Botany 40: 276-80. PDF fulltext
 Pool, A. (2001). Urera. In: Stevens, W. D., et al. (eds.): Flora de Nicaragua (Vol. 3): 2492–95. Monographs in Botany 85. St. Louis, Missouri, USA: Missouri Botanical Garden Press.
 Standley, P. C. &  Steyermark, J. A. (1952). Urera. Fieldiana Botany 24(3), 424-28. PDF fulltext
 Sytsma, K. J., et al. (2002). Urticalean rosids: circumscription, rosid ancestry, and phylogenetics based on rbcL, trnL-F, and ndhF sequences. American Journal of Botany 89(9), 1531–46.
 Weddell, H. A. (1869). Myriocarpa. In: de Candolle, A. P. (ed.): Prodromus systematis naturalis regni vegetabilis (Vol. 16): 23533–36. Paris, France.

 
Urticaceae genera
Pantropical flora
Taxa named by Charles Gaudichaud-Beaupré
Dioecious plants